Normethadone (INN, BAN; brand names Cophylac, Dacartil, Eucopon, Mepidon, Noramidone, Normedon, and others), also known as desmethylmethadone or phenyldimazone, is a synthetic opioid analgesic and antitussive agent.
Normethadone is listed under the Single Convention on Narcotic Drugs 1961 and is a Schedule I Narcotic controlled substance in the United States, with a DEA ACSCN of 9635 and an annual manufacturing quota of 2 grams.  The salts in use are the hydrobromide (free base conversion ratio 0.785), hydrochloride (0.890), methyliodide (0.675), oxalate (0.766), picrate (0.563), and the 2,6-ditertbutylnapthalindisulphonate (0.480).

See also
 Methade

References

Dimethylamino compounds
Analgesics
Antitussives
Ketones
Mu-opioid receptor agonists
Synthetic opioids